Quarters of nobility is an expression used in the bestowal of hereditary titles and refers to the number of generations in typically an ahnentafel in which noble status has been held by a family regardless of whether a title was actually in use by each person in the ancestral line in question.

For example, a person having sixteen quarterings (formally in heraldry Seize Quartiers) might have exclusively noble ancestry for the four previous generations (i.e., to the great-great-grandparent level):  Given two parents per generation, four generations of uninterrupted nobility = 24 = 16.  Alternatively, such a person might have exclusively noble ancestry for the five previous generations on one side but have a commoner for their other parent, such that the latter side of that person's ancestry would "dilute" by half the nobility they derived from the former side: (25)/2 = 32/2 = 16.

Some orders of chivalry limit their membership to persons who can prove a certain number of quarterings (e.g., sixteen for the Order of St. John).

References

Titles
Family trees